The Book of Abraham is a collection of writings claimed to be from several Egyptian scrolls discovered in the early 19th century during an archeological expedition by Antonio Lebolo. Members of the Church of Jesus Christ of Latter-day Saints purchased the scrolls from a traveling mummy exhibition on July 3, 1835, to be translated into English by Joseph Smith. According to Smith, the book was "a translation of some ancient records... purporting to be the writings of Abraham, while he was in Egypt, called the Book of Abraham, written by his own hand, upon papyrus". Smith said the papyri described Abraham's early life, his travels to Canaan and Egypt, and his vision of the cosmos and its creation.

The Latter-day Saints believe the work is divinely inspired scripture, published as part of the Pearl of Great Price since 1880. It thus forms a doctrinal foundation for the LDS Church and Mormon fundamentalist denominations, though other groups, such as the Community of Christ, do not consider it a sacred text. The book contains several doctrines that are unique to Mormonism such as the idea that God organized eternal elements to create the universe (instead of creating it ex nihilo), the potential exaltation of humanity, a pre-mortal existence, the first and second estates, and the plurality of gods.

The Book of Abraham papyri were thought to have been lost in the 1871 Great Chicago Fire. However, in 1966 several fragments of the papyri were found in the archives of the Metropolitan Museum of Art in New York and in the LDS Church archives. They are now referred to as the Joseph Smith Papyri. Upon examination by professional Egyptologists (both Mormon and otherwise), these fragments were identified as Egyptian funerary texts, including the "Breathing Permit of Hôr" and the "Book of the Dead", among others. Although some Mormon apologists defend the authenticity of the Book of Abraham, no other scholars regard it as an ancient text.

Origin

Eleven mummies and several papyri were discovered near the ancient Egyptian city of Thebes by Antonio Lebolo between 1818 and 1822. Following Lebolo's death in 1830, the mummies and assorted objects were sent to New York with instructions that they should be sold in order to benefit the heirs of Lebolo. Michael H. Chandler eventually came into possession of the mummies and artifacts and began displaying them, starting in Philadelphia. Over the next two years Chandler toured the eastern United States, displaying and selling some of the mummies as he traveled.

In late June or early July 1835, Chandler exhibited his collection in Kirtland, Ohio. A promotional flyer created by Chandler states that the mummies "may have lived in the days of Jacob, Moses, or David". At the time, Kirtland was the home of the Latter Day Saints, led by Joseph Smith. In 1830 Smith published the Book of Mormon which he said he translated from ancient golden plates that had been inscribed with "reformed Egyptian" text. He took an immediate interest in the papyri and soon offered Chandler a preliminary translation of the scrolls. Smith said that the scrolls contained the writings of Abraham and Joseph, as well as a short history of an Egyptian princess named "Katumin". He wrote:

Smith, Joseph Coe, and Simeon Andrews soon purchased the four mummies and at least five papyrus documents for $2,400.

Translation process

Ancient Egyptian writing systems had been a subject fascination for centuries, drawing the attention of scholars who attempted to understand the symbols. The Rosetta Stone, an ancient monument discovered in 1799, had the same message written in ancient Egyptian and the Greek alphabet, allowing for the first comprehensive understanding of ancient Egyptian in modern times. However, at the time Smith began his efforts the Rosetta Stone was not fully understood. Not until the 1850s would there be a wide scholarly consensus on how to translate ancient Egyptian writing.

Between July and November 1835 Smith began "translating an alphabet to the Book of Abraham, and arranging a grammar of the Egyptian language as practiced by the ancients." In so doing, Smith worked closely with Cowdery and Phelps. The result of this effort was a collection of documents and manuscripts now known as the Kirtland Egyptian papers. One of these manuscripts was a bound book titled simply "Grammar & A[l]phabet of the Egyptian Language", which contained Smith's interpretations of the Egyptian glyphs. The first part of the book focuses almost entirely on deciphering Egyptian characters, and the second part deals with a form of astronomy that was supposedly practiced by the ancient Egyptians.  Most of the writing in the book was written not by Smith but rather by a scribe taking down what Smith said.

The "Egyptian Alphabet" manuscript is particularly important because it illustrates how Smith attempted to translate the papyri. First, the characters on the papyri were transcribed onto the left-hand side of the book. Next, a postulation as to what the symbols sounded like was devised. Finally, an English interpretation of the symbol was provided. Smith's subsequent translation of the papyri takes on the form of five "degrees" of interpretation, each degree representing a deeper and more complex level of interpretation.

In translating the book, Smith dictated, and Phelps, Warren Parrish, and Frederick G. Williams acted as scribes. The complete work was first published serially in the Latter Day Saint movement newspaper Times and Seasons in 1842, and was later canonized in 1880 by the LDS Church as part of its Pearl of Great Price.

Eyewitness accounts of how the Papyri were translated are few and vague.  Warren Parish, who was Joseph Smith's scribe at the time of the translation, wrote in 1838 after he had left the church: "I have set by his side and penned down the translation of the Egyptian Hieroglyphicks [sic] as he claimed to receive it by direct inspiration from Heaven."  Wilford Woodruff and Parley P. Pratt intimated second hand that the Urim and Thummim were used in the translation.

A non-church member who saw the mummies in Kirtland spoke about the state of the papyri, and the translation process:

"These records were torn by being taken from the roll of embalming salve which contained them, and some parts entirely lost but Smith is to translate the whole by divine inspiration, and that which was lost, like Nebuchadnezzar's dream can be interpreted as well as that which is preserved;"

Content

Book of Abraham text

The Book of Abraham tells a story of Abraham's life, travels to Canaan and Egypt, and a vision he received concerning the universe, a pre-mortal existence, and the creation of the world. Although the nineteenth-century American context surrounding Smith's papyri translation was rife with Egyptomania, the Book of Abraham itself does not contain the popular tropes then associated with ancient Egypt, such as mummies or pyramids, and its content instead "grew out of the Bible."

The book has five chapters, outlined below:

Nearly half of the Book of Abraham shows a dependence on the King James Version of the Book of Genesis. According to H. Michael Marquardt, "It seems clear that Smith had the Bible open to Genesis as he dictated this section [i.e., Chapter2] of the 'Book of Abraham.'" Smith explained the similarities by reasoning that when Moses penned Genesis, he used the Book of Abraham as a guide, abridging and condensing where he saw fit. As such, since Moses was recalling Abraham's lifetime, his version was in the third person, whereas the Book of Abraham, being written by its titular author, was composed in the first person.

The Book of Abraham was incomplete when Joseph Smith died in 1844.  It is unknown how long the text would be, but Oliver Cowdery gave an indication in 1835 that it could be quite large:

When the translation of these valuable documents will be completed, I am unable to say; neither can I gave you a probable idea how large volumes they will make; but judging from their size, and the comprehensiveness of the language, one might reasonably expect to see sufficient to develop much on the mighty of the ancient men of God.

A visitor to Kirtland saw the mummies, and noted, "They say that the mummies were Epyptian, but the records are those of Abraham and Joseph...and a larger volume than the Bible will be required to contain them."

Distinct doctrines

The Book of Abraham text is a source of some distinct Latter Day Saint doctrines, which Mormon author Randal S. Chase calls "truths of the gospel of Jesus Christ that were previously unknown to Church members of Joseph Smith's day." Examples include the nature of the priesthood, an understanding of the cosmos, the exaltation of humanity, a pre-mortal existence, the first and second estates, and the plurality of gods.

The Book of Abraham expands upon the nature of the priesthood in the Latter Day Saint movement, and it is suggested in the work that those who are foreordained to the priesthood earned this right by valor or nobility in the pre-mortal life. In a similar vein, the Book explicitly denotes that Pharaoh was a descendant of Ham and thus "of that lineage by which he could not have the right of Priesthood". This passage is the only one found in any Mormon scripture that bars a particular lineage of people from holding the priesthood.  Even though nothing in the Book of Abraham explicitly connects the line of Pharaoh and Ham to black Africans, this passage was used as a scriptural basis for withholding the priesthood from black individuals. An 1868 Juvenile Instructor article points to the Pearl of Great Price as the "source of racial attitudes in church doctrine", and in 1900, First Presidency member George Q. Cannon began using the story of Pharaoh as a scriptural basis for the ban. In 1912, the First Presidency responded to an inquiry about the priesthood ban by using the story of Pharaoh.  By the early 1900s, it became the foundation of church policy in regards to the priesthood ban.  The 2002 Doctrine and Covenants Student Manual points to Abraham 1:21–27 as the reasoning behind not giving black people the priesthood until 1978.

Chapter 3 of the Book of Abraham describes a unique (and purportedly Egyptian) understanding of the hierarchy of heavenly bodies, each with different movements and measurements of time. In regard to this chapter, Randal S. Chase notes, "With divine help, Abraham was able to gain greater comprehension of the order of the galaxies, stars, and planets than he could have obtained from earthly sources." At the pinnacle of the cosmos is the slowest-rotating body, Kolob, which, according to the text, is the star closest to where God lives. The Book of Abraham is the only work in the Latter Day Saint canon to mention the star Kolob. According to the Book:

Based on this verse, the LDS Church claims that "Kolob is the star nearest to the presence of God [and] the governing star in all the universe." Time moves slowly on the celestial body; one Kolob-day corresponds to 1,000 earth-years. The Church also notes: "Kolob is also symbolic of Jesus Christ, the central figure in God's plan of salvation."

The Book of Abraham also explores pre-mortal existence. The LDS Church website explains: "Life did not begin at birth, as is commonly believed. Prior to coming to earth, individuals existed as spirits." These spirits are eternal and of different intelligences. Prior to mortal existence, spirits exist in the "first estate". Once certain spirits (i.e., those who choose to follow the plan of salvation offered by God the Father of their own accord) take on a mortal form, they enter into what is called the "second estate". The doctrine of the second estate is explicitly named only in this book. The purpose of earthly life, therefore, is for humans to prepare for a meeting with God; the Church, citing  notes: "All who accept and obey the saving principles and ordinances of the gospel of Jesus Christ will receive eternal life, the greatest gift of God, and will have 'glory added upon their heads for ever and ever'."

Also notable is the Book of Abraham's description of a plurality of gods, and that "the gods" created the Earth, not ex nihilo, but rather from pre-existing, eternal matter. This shift away from monotheism and towards henotheism occurred , when Smith was imprisoned in the Liberty Jail in Clay County, Missouri (this was after the majority of the Book of Abraham had been supposedly translated, but prior to its publication). Smith noted that there would be "a time come in the [sic]  which nothing shall be with held [sic] whither [sic] there be one god or many gods they [sic] shall be manifest all thrones and dominions, principalities and powers shall be revealed and set forth upon all who have indured [sic] valiently [sic] for the gospel of Jesus Christ" and that all will be revealed "according to that which was ordained in the midst of the councyl [sic] of the eternal God of all other Gods before this world was."

Facsimiles

Three images (facsimiles of vignettes on the papyri) and Joseph Smith's explanations of them were printed in the 1842 issues of the Times and Seasons. These three illustrations were prepared by Smith and an engraver named Reuben Hedlock. The facsimiles and their respective explanations were later included with the text of the Pearl of Great Price in a re-engraved format. According to Smith's explanations, Facsimile No.1 portrays Abraham fastened to an altar, with the idolatrous priest of Elkenah attempting to sacrifice him. Facsimile No.2 contains representations of celestial objects, including the heavens and earth, fifteen other planets or stars, the sun and moon, the number 1,000 and God revealing the grand key-words of the holy priesthood. Facsimile No.3 portrays Abraham in the court of Pharaoh "reasoning upon the principles of Astronomy".

Interpretations and contributions to the Latter Day Saint movement

The Church of Jesus Christ of Latter-day Saints
The Book of Abraham was canonized in 1880 by the LDS Church, and it remains a part of the larger scriptural work, the Pearl of Great Price. For Latter-day Saints, the book links Old and New Testament covenants into a universal narrative of Christian salvation, expands on premortal existence, depicts ex materia cosmology, and informed Smith's developing understanding of temple theology, making the scripture "critical to understanding the totality of his gospel conception".

Church leadership traditionally described the Book of Abraham straightforwardly as "translated by the Prophet [Joseph Smith] from a papyrus record taken from the catacombs of Egypt", and "Some have assumed that hieroglyphs adjacent to and surrounding facsimile 1 must be a source for the text of the book of Abraham". However, modern Egyptological translations of papyrus fragments reveal the surviving Egyptian text matches the Breathing Permit of Hôr, an Egyptian funerary text, and does not mention Abraham. The church acknowledges this, and its members have adopted a range of interpretations of the Book of Abraham to accommodate the seeming disconnect between the surviving papyrus and Smith's Book of Abraham revelation. The two most common interpretations are sometimes called the "missing scroll theory" and the "catalyst theory", though the relative popularity of these theories among Latter-day Saints is unclear.

The "missing scroll theory" holds that Smith may have translated the Book of Abraham from a now-lost portion of papyri, with the text of Breathing Permit of Hôr having nothing to do with Smith's translation. John Gee, an Egyptologist and Latter-day Saint, and the apologetic organization FAIR (Faithful Answers, Informed Response; formerly FairMormon) favor this view.

Other Latter-day Saints hold to the "catalyst theory," which hypothesizes that Smith's "study of the papyri may have led to a revelation about key events and teachings in the life of Abraham", allowing him to "translate" the Book of Abraham from the Breathing Permit of Hôr papyrus by inspiration without actually relying on the papyrus' textual meaning. This theory draws theological basis from Smith's "New Translation" of the Bible, wherein in the course of rereading the first few chapters of Genesis, he dictated as a revelatory translation the much longer Book of Moses.

FAIR has claimed the church "favors the missing scroll theory". However, in 2019, the Joseph Smith Papers' documentary research on the Book of Abraham and Egyptian papyri makes it "clear that Joseph Smith and/or his clerks associated the characters from the [surviving Breathing Permit of Hôr] papyri with the English Book of Abraham text",

Community of Christ

The Community of Christ, formerly known as the Reorganized Church of Jesus Christ of Latter Day Saints, does not include the Book of Abraham in its scriptural canon, although it was referenced in early church publications.

Church of Jesus Christ of Latter Day Saints (Strangite)

The Strangite branch of the movement does not take an official position on the Book of Abraham. The branch notes, "We know that 'The Book of Abraham' was published in an early periodical as a text 'purporting to be the writings of Abraham' with no indication of its translation process (see Times and Seasons, March 1, 1842), and therefore have no authorized position on it."

Fundamentalist Church of Jesus Christ of Latter-Day Saints

The Fundamentalist Church of Jesus Christ of Latter-Day Saints holds to the canonicity of the Book of Abraham.

Loss and rediscovery of the papyrus

After Joseph Smith's death, the Egyptian artifacts were in the possession of his mother, Lucy Mack Smith, and she and her son William Smith continued to exhibit the four mummies and associated papyri to visitors. Two weeks after Lucy's death in May 1856, Smith's widow, Emma Hale Smith Bidamon, her second husband Lewis C. Bidamon, and her son Joseph Smith III, sold "four Egyptian mummies with the records with them" to Abel Combs on May26, 1856. Combs later sold two of the mummies, along with some papyri, to the St. Louis Museum in 1856. Upon the closing of the St.Louis Museum, these artifacts were purchased by Joseph H. Wood and found their way to the Chicago Museum in about 1863, and were promptly put on display. The museum and all its contents were burned in 1871 during the Great Chicago Fire. Today it is presumed that the papyri that formed the basis for Facsimiles2 and3 were lost in the conflagration.

After the fire, however, it was believed that all the sources for the book had been lost. Despite this belief, Abel Combs still owned several papyri fragments and two mummies. While the fate of the mummies is unknown, the fragments were passed to Combs' nurse Charlotte Benecke Weaver, who gave them to her daughter, Alice Heusser. In 1918 Heusser approached the New York Metropolitan Museum of Art (MMA) about purchasing the items; at the time, the museum curators were not interested, but in 1947 they changed their mind, and the museum bought the papyri from Heusser's widower husband, Edward. In the 1960s the MMA decided to raise money by selling some of its items which were considered "less unique". Among these were the papyri that Heusser had sold to the museum several decades earlier. In May 1966, Aziz S. Atiya, a Coptic scholar from the University of Utah, was looking through the MMA's collection when he came across the Heusser fragments; upon examining them, he recognized one as the vignette known as Facsmile1 from The Pearl of Great Price. He informed LDS Church leaders, and several months later, on November27, 1967, the LDS Church was able to procure the fragments, and according to Henry G. Fischer, curator of the Egyptian Collection at the MMA, an anonymous donation to the MMA made it possible for the LDS Church to acquire the papyri. The subsequent transfer included ten pieces of papyri, including the original of Facsimile1. The eleventh fragment had been given to Brigham Young (then church president) previously by Chief Banquejappa of the Pottawatomie tribe in 1846.

Three of these fragments were designated Joseph Smith Papyrus (JSP) I, X, and XI. Other fragments, designated JSPII, IV, V, VI, VII, and VIII, are thought by critics to be the Book of Joseph to which Smith had referred. Egyptologist John A. Wilson stated that the recovered fragments indicated the existence of at least six to eight separate documents. The twelfth fragment was discovered in the LDS Church Historian's office and was dubbed the "Church Historian's Fragment". Disclosed by the church in 1968, the fragment was designated JSPIX. Although there is some debate about how much of the papyrus collection is missing, there is broad agreement that the recovered papyri are portions of Smith's original purchase, partly based on the fact that they were pasted onto paper which had "drawings of a temple and maps of the Kirtland, Ohio area" on the back, as well as the fact that they were accompanied by an affidavit by Emma Smith stating that they had been in the possession of Joseph Smith.

Controversy and criticism

Since its publication in 1842, the Book of Abraham has been a source of controversy. Non-Mormon Egyptologists, beginning in the late 19th century, have disagreed with Joseph Smith's explanations of the facsimiles. They have also asserted that damaged portions of the papyri have been reconstructed incorrectly. In 1912, a letter about the Book of Abraham was published by Arthur Cruttenden Mace, Assistant Curator in the Department of Egyptian Art in New York's Metropolitan Museum of Art. He wrote:

I return herewith, under separate cover, the 'Pearl of Great Price.' The 'Book of Abraham,' it is hardly necessary to say, is a pure fabrication. Cuts 1 and 3 are inaccurate copies of well known scenes on funeral papyri, and cut 2 is a copy of one of the magical discs which in the late Egyptian period were placed under the heads of mummies. There were about forty of these latter known in museums and they are all very similar in character. Joseph Smith's interpretation of these cuts is a farrago of nonsense from beginning to end. Egyptian characters can now be read almost as easily as Greek, and five minutes' study in an Egyptian gallery of any museum should be enough to convince any educated man of the clumsiness of the imposture.
  
The controversy intensified in the late 1960s when portions of the Joseph Smith Papyri were located. The translation of the papyri by both Mormon and non-Mormon Egyptologists does not match the text of the Book of Abraham as purportedly translated by Joseph Smith. Indeed, the transliterated text from the recovered papyri and facsimiles published in the Book of Abraham contain no direct references, either historical or textual, to Abraham, and Abraham's name does not appear anywhere in the papyri or the facsimiles. Edward Ashment notes, "The sign that Smith identified with Abraham [...] is nothing more than the hieratic version of [...] a 'w' in Egyptian. It has no phonetic or semantic relationship to [Smith's] 'Ah-broam.'" University of Chicago Egyptologist Robert K. Ritner concluded in 2014 that the source of the Book of Abraham "is the 'Breathing Permit of Hôr,' misunderstood and mistranslated by Joseph Smith", and that the other papyri are common Egyptian funerary documents like the Book of the Dead.

Original manuscripts of the Book of Abraham, microfilmed in 1966 by Jerald Tanner, show portions of the Joseph Smith Papyri and their purported translations into the Book of Abraham. Ritner concludes, contrary to the LDS position, due to the microfilms being published prior to the rediscovery of the Joseph Smith Papyri, that "it is not true that 'no eyewitness account of the translation survives'", that the Book of Abraham is "confirmed as a perhaps well-meaning, but erroneous invention by Joseph Smith", and "despite its inauthenticity as a genuine historical narrative, the Book of Abraham remains a valuable witness to early American religious history and to the recourse to ancient texts as sources of modern religious faith and speculation".

Book of Joseph

As noted above, a second untranslated work was identified by Joseph Smith after scrutinizing the original papyri. He said that one scroll contained "the writings of Joseph of Egypt". Based on descriptions by Oliver Cowdery, some, including Charles M. Larson, believe that the fragments Joseph Smith Papyri II, IV, V, VI, VII, and VIII are the source of this work.

See also 

 Kirtland Egyptian Papers
 Mormon cosmology
 Scrolls of Abraham
 Testament of Abraham

Notes

References

Footnotes

Bibliography

.
.
.
.

.

 .
.
.
.

 
.
.
.

 .
.
.
.
.
.

.
.
.
.
.
.
.
.
.

.
.
.
.
.
.

External links

 Translation and Historicity of the Book of Abraham, from the LDS Church website
 The Pearl of Great Price (containing the Book of Abraham), from the LDS Church website
 Book of Abraham manuscript materials from The Joseph Smith Papers

 
1835 books
1835 in Christianity
Creation myths
Egyptology
Mormonism-related controversies
Pearl of Great Price (Mormonism)
Joseph Smith
Unfinished books
Works by Joseph Smith
Works in the style of the King James Version
Works originally published in Times and Seasons